Oriente is one of the 18 barrios of the municipality of San Juan, Puerto Rico. It is composed of 3 subbarrios: Borinquen, López Sicardó, and San José. Before 1951, it was a barrio of the former municipality of Rio Piedras. In 2010, it had a population of 31,374. It is surrounded by the barrios of Sabana Llana Norte to the east, Sabana Llana Sur to the south, Hato Rey Central and Hato Rey Norte to the west, and Santurce barrio and the San Jose Lagoon to the north.

Demographics

See also
 List of communities in Puerto Rico

References

 
Río Piedras, Puerto Rico
Barrios of San Juan, Puerto Rico